Hymenobacter wooponensis  is a Gram-negative, aerobic, rod-shaped and non-motile bacterium from the genus of Hymenobacter which has been isolated from whater from Woopo wetland in Korea.

References 

wooponensis
Bacteria described in 2015